The Orco (that is lit. Water of gold) is an Italian river. It originates in the Piedmontese slopes of Gran Paradiso and after about  reaches the Po river near Chivasso, in the Metropolitan City of Turin. Its drainage basin is home to the most important complex of hydropower in Piedmont, consisting of six major dams (Agnel, Serrù, Ceresole Reale, Teleccio, Piantonetto, Valsoera), many smaller reservoirs and numerous turbines and power stations.

The Orco is known also for its gold-bearing sand, extracted already in antiquity. Even today there is a certain activity, on an amateur level, searching for grains of gold.

See also 
 Orco Valley

Notes 
 

Rivers of the Province of Turin
Rivers of Italy
Rivers of the Alps
Braided rivers in Italy